Nanocheirodon insignis is a species of characin endemic to Colombia where it is found in Lake Maracaibo and the Magdalena River basin.  It is the only member of its genus.

References
 

Characidae
Monotypic fish genera
Endemic fauna of Colombia
Freshwater fish of Colombia
Magdalena River